Moshe Arditi is a Turkish-American physician who holds multiple appointments in the Departments of Biomedical Sciences and Pediatrics at Cedars-Sinai Medical Center, and as a researcher at UCLA. Dr. Arditi is a contributor to more than 103 peer reviewed articles.

He received his medical degree from Istanbul University-Cerrahpaşa (1981), and then worked in the neonatology laboratory of Yale School of Medicine. He completed postgraduate training at the University of Chicago Pritzker School of Medicine and the Lurie Children's Hospital, affiliated with the Northwestern University Feinberg School of Medicine.

Arditi is particularly noted for his research on Kawasaki disease vasculitis. He received the Cedars-Sinai Pioneer in Medicine Award, 2019,  and Cedars-Sinai Prize for Research in Scientific Medicine, 2022.

References

Living people
Year of birth missing (living people)

Istanbul University Cerrahpaşa Faculty of Medicine alumni
Turkish emigrants to the United States
American medical academics
American medical researchers